IFC Mall may refer to:

 IFC Mall (Hong Kong)
 IFC Mall (Seoul)
 IFC Mall (Shanghai)